is a former sumo wrestler from Kusatsu, Shiga, Japan. He made his professional debut in March 1983, but although he won the second division championship in November 1989, he never reached the top division. His highest rank was jūryō 2. He left the sumo world upon retirement from active competition in September 1993.

Career record

See also
Glossary of sumo terms
List of past sumo wrestlers
List of sumo tournament second division champions

References

1965 births
Living people
Japanese sumo wrestlers
Sumo people from Shiga Prefecture